The Austria Formula 3 Cup is an open wheel racing series based in Austria. The series has run since 1982 and regular visits such circuits as the Salzburgring and the Red Bull Ring in Austria, the Autodrom Most and the Brno Circuit in the Czech Republic and the Hockenheimring in Germany. It's now called the "Drexler-Automotive Formel 3 Pokal" for the main Cup and "Drexler-Automotive Formel 3 Trophy" for the B division older chassis cars.

Scoring system

Champions

See also
Formula Three

References

External links
Austria Formula 3 Cup official website (German)

1982 establishments in Austria
 
Formula Three series
Formula 3